The term National Museum of Art or National Art Museum may refer to:

Latvian National Museum of Art, Riga
M. K. Čiurlionis National Art Museum, Lithuania
Museu Nacional d'Art de Catalunya, Barcelona,  in Spain
National Art Gallery, Chennai, Egmore, Southern India
National Art Museum of Azerbaijan, Baku
National Art Museum of China, Beijing
National Art Museum station in Line 8, Beijing Subway
National Art Museum of Ukraine, Kyiv
National Museum of Art, Architecture and Design, Oslo, Norway
National Museum of Art, Haiti, Port-au-Prince
National Museum of Art, Osaka, Japan
National Museum of Art of Romania, Bucharest
National Museum of Art of Wales, located within the National Museum Cardiff

See also
Raqqada, the National Museum of Islamic Art in Tunisia